Bolat Esmagambetov (born 1 April 1968) is a retired football forward from Kazakhstan. He obtained a total number of seven caps for the Kazakhstan national football team during his career, scoring three goals.

References 

1968 births
Living people
Kazakhstani footballers
Kazakhstan international footballers
Association football forwards
Kazakhstan Premier League players
FC Irtysh Pavlodar players
FC Spartak Semey players
Pallo-Kerho 37 players
FC Lokomotiv Saint Petersburg players
FC Oryol players